The 1902 Rutgers Queensmen football team represented Rutgers University as an independent during the 1902 college football season. In their first and only season under head coach Henry Van Hoevenberg, the Queensmen compiled a 3–7 record and were outscored by their opponents, 188 to 42. The team captain was Alfred Ellet Hitchner.

Schedule

References

Rutgers
Rutgers Scarlet Knights football seasons
Rutgers Queensmen football